The Soviet First League (1936–91) was the second tier league of association football in the Soviet Union. In the 1946 season, VVS Moscow finished top of the Southern Group, and FC Pishchevik Moscow finished top of the Eastern Group. VVS won the two-leg playoff.

League standings

Southern Group

Eastern Group 
All Russia

Play off
VVS - Pishchevik 3:2 1:0 (first game on September 18, second - September 22, all in Moscow)

Number of teams by republics

See also
 1946 Soviet First Group

External links
 1946 Soviet Second Group. RSSSF

1936
2
Soviet
Soviet